Esene Faimalo (born 11 October 1966) is a  former professional rugby league footballer who played in the 1980s and 1990s, who represented both Western Samoa and New Zealand at international level.

Playing career
In 1985 Faimalo came second in the New Zealand boxing Heavyweight tournament and also made the Junior Kiwis while playing for the Linwood club. Faimalo represented Western Samoa at the 1986 Pacific Cup.

A Canterbury representative from the Addington club, Faimalo also represented the New Zealand national rugby league team between 1988 and 1991, playing in five test matches. Faimalo spent 1989 with the Balmain Tigers as part of the New Zealand Rugby League's "Rookie Scheme".

In 1990 he moved to England, signing with the Widnes Vikings. He played for the club for four seasons, making 111 appearances and scoring 11 tries,  before signing with the Leeds Rhinos in 1994, where he scored seven tries in 54 appearances. He joined the Salford City Reds during 1996's  Super League I season, playing with the club for three years. He returned to Widnes in 2000, making a further five appearances before retiring.

In 2010 Faimalo entered the boxing ring in a charity bout to raise money for the Steve Prescott Foundation.

Genealogical information
Esene Faimalo is the brother of the rugby league footballer Joe Faimalo.

References

1966 births
Addington Magpies players
Canterbury rugby league team players
Leeds Rhinos players
Linwood Keas players
Living people
New Zealand national rugby league team players
New Zealand sportspeople of Samoan descent
New Zealand expatriate sportspeople in England
New Zealand rugby league players
Salford Red Devils players
Samoa national rugby league team players
South Island rugby league team players
Sydenham Swans players
Upper Hutt Tigers players
Samoan rugby league players
Wellington rugby league team players
Widnes Vikings players
Junior Kiwis players
New Zealand male boxers
Rugby league props